Congregation Beth Israel, was a synagogue in East Flatbush neighborhood of New York City. It met at 203 E. 37th St., a building they put up in 1928.

The synagogue membership declined with the migration of the local Jewish populace to wealthier areas of Brooklyn and to the suburbs. It became defunct around 1970, and sold its building to Mt. Zion Church of God 7th Day at that time.

The former synagogue building was listed on the National Register of Historic Places in 2009. It is a two-story rectangular structure of buff brick, with Romanesque and Classical Revival style elements. It has a tripartite front façade with round arch windows.  It features the Star of David on the front fence, the stained glass windows, pews, and plaster work.

References

External links
New York Landmarks Conservancy website

Synagogues completed in 1928
Properties of religious function on the National Register of Historic Places in Brooklyn
Synagogues in Brooklyn
East Flatbush, Brooklyn
Synagogues on the National Register of Historic Places in New York City